The Zira FK 2016–17 season is Zira's second Azerbaijan Premier League season, and third season in their history. It is their second season with Adil Shukurov as manager, during which they will participate in the Azerbaijan Cup as well as the League.

Season events
On 27 December 2016, Adil Shukurov had his contract as manager terminated by mutual consent, with Aykhan Abbasov taking over as manager until the end of the season.

Squad

Transfers

Summer

In:

Out:

Winter

In:

Out:

Friendlies

Competitions

Overview

Premier League

Results summary

Results

League table

Azerbaijan Cup

Squad statistics

Appearances and goals

|-
|colspan="14"|Players who left Zira during the season:

|}

Goal scorers

Disciplinary record

References

Azerbaijani football clubs 2016–17 season
Zira FK